Wayne County Schools is a school district in Wayne County, Tennessee, United States.  There are 8 schools in the district.

Administrators
Director of Schools: Gailand Grinder
Supervisor of Education: Ricky Inman Ed. D.
Supervisor of Special Education: Kristy Prince Ed.D.
Supervisor of Federal Projects: Lee Ann Staggs
Supervisor of Food Service: Nancy Morgan
Supervisor of Attendance and Transportation: Marlon Davis
Supervisor of Educational Technology: David Walker

Schools

High schools
Collinwood High School
Wayne County High School

Middle schools
Collinwood Middle School
Waynesboro Middle School

Elementary schools
Collinwood Elementary School
Waynesboro Elementary School

Comprehensive (K-12) schools
Frank Hughes School

Technology Center
Wayne County Technology Center

See also
List of high schools in Tennessee
List of school districts in Tennessee

References

External links

Map of Wayne County Schools in 1940
 Old School Pictures

School districts in Tennessee
Education in Wayne County, Tennessee